Cheatum's snail also known as the Phantom tryonia, scientific name Tryonia cheatumi, is a species of small freshwater snails with a gill and an operculum,  aquatic gastropod mollusks in the family Hydrobiidae.

This species is endemic to the United States.

References 

Endemic fauna of the United States
Tryonia
Gastropods described in 1935
Taxonomy articles created by Polbot